Vladimir Anatolyevich Kuzichkin Владимир Анатольевич Кузичкин (born 1947) is a former Soviet KGB (PGU KGB SSSR) officer who defected to the Tehran Station of the British secret intelligence service in 1982. Information on Soviet agents and socialist activists in Iran that he passed on to MI6 was subsequently provided by the agency, along with the CIA, to the Khomeini regime, which executed many of the agents. Ali Agca claimed that Major Kuzichkin ordered him to kill John Paul II. 

He published his memoirs in English in 1991 with the title of Inside the KGB: Myth and Reality.

See also
 List of Eastern Bloc defectors
 List of KGB defectors

References

1947 births
Living people
Soviet intelligence personnel who defected to the United Kingdom
KGB operatives in Iran